The 2009 Brazilian federal budget was submitted to the National Congress of Brazil by President Luiz Inácio Lula da Silva on August 27, 2008.

Total receipts
The total receipts for fiscal year 2009 are estimated at US$657.9 billion.

Primary receipts: $258.9 billion
 $157.8 billion - Federal taxes and tributes
 $43.6 billion - Social security contributions
 $57.5 billion - Other
Financial income: $399 billion
Total income: $657.9 billion

Total expenses
The total expenses for 2009 amount to US$657.9 billion.

Mandatory spending: $541 billion
 $49.9 billion - Payroll
 $20.8 billion - Social security
 $345.7 billion - Public debt amortization
 $69.7 billion - Public debt interest
 $17.5 billion - Investments
 $14 billion - Reserve
 $23.4 billion - Other financial expenses
Discretionary spending: $116.9 billion
Total expenses: $657.9 billion

References

External links
 Chamber of Deputies 2008 Budget Portal
 Federal Senate Federal Budget Portal
 Ministry of Planning, Budget and Management - Federal Budget Secretary (SOF)

Federal
Brazilian budgets
Brazilian federal budget